Othello is a manga by Toui Hasumi. It was licensed in English by Digital Manga Publishing and published on 27 June 2007.

Reception
Julie Rosato enjoyed the plotting of the title work in the anthology. Leroy Dessaroux enjoyed the "beautiful art featuring distinctive figure drawing" of the anthology.

References

External links
 

2002 manga
Yaoi anime and manga
Digital Manga Publishing titles